Zerkalo dushi is the debut studio album by Russian soviet singer Alla Pugacheva released in the USSR in February 1978 (as double album). Later the album was released as two separate records.

The album includes songs mainly composed by Aleksandr Zatsepin. The album also includes three songs composed by Alla Pugacheva (under the pseudonym "Boris Gorbonos") two songs with music by Boris Rychkov and Mark Minkov. 

The album was also released abroad in Bulgaria, Poland, Czechoslovakia and Spain.

Background 
Since 1965 Alla Pugacheva begins her concert activity. In 1965 she went on the first tour in her life, it was a concert trip with mosestrada in the program "Bang-Bang, or Satirical shots at misses", and in 1967 as part of the propaganda team of the radio station "Yunost" on a tour of the Arctic And Tyumen. After graduating from the music school, she became a soloist of the Rosconcert and a concertmaster at the State School of Circus and Variety Art (GUTSEI), and than stood soloist of the VIA Novy electron at the Lipetsk regional Philharmonic. During the following years, Pugacheva worked in VIA Moskvichi in the Moscow regional Philharmonic in a jazz orchestra conducted by Oleg Lundstrom. In 1974 for her performance of the songs "Posidim, pookayem" and "Ermolova s Chistykh prudov", she was awarded the third prize at the Fifth all-Union competition of pop artists. In 1974-1976 she was a soloist of VIA Vesyolye Rebyata. In 1975 at the Golden Orpheus festival Pugacheva was awarded the Grand Prix for her performance of the song "Arlekino". This victory made her popular in the USSR and abroad. Later that year she released her first solo EP. After leaving the Vesyolye Rebyata in 1976, Pugacheva was briefly a soloist of the State variety orchestra of Armenia under the baton of Konstantin Orbelian. In 1977, having started a solo career, she was accompanied by VIA Rhythm from the Kharkov regional Philharmonic. In 1978, at the competition "Intervision Song Contest" in Sopot (Poland), the singer was awarded the Grand Prix for the performance of the song "Vsyo mogut koroli". Songs performed by her at that time were very often heard on radio and broadcast on television, but there was no solo album until 1978.

Track listing

Charts

Monthly charts

Year-end charts 

 Notes

References

Bibliography

External links

1978 debut albums
Alla Pugacheva albums
Melodiya albums
Russian-language albums